Jerzy Bordziłowski (16 November 1900 – 5 April 1983) was a Polish and Soviet military officer and communist politician.

Biography
Born in Ostrów Mazowiecka to a Polish doctor serving in the Russian Imperial Army, he spent his childhood in Kherson. In 1919 he joined the Red Army and fought against Poland during the Polish-Bolshevist War and in the Russian Civil War. After the outbreak of Nazi-Soviet War he was promoted to the rank of Colonel and became the chief inspector of engineers and sappers of the 21st Army. He took part in the Battle of Stalingrad and in September 1942 was promoted to the rank of General and became the deputy commanding officer of the Voronezh Front.

On 24 September 1944 he was dispatched by his Soviet superiors to join the Polish Army along with a number of high-ranking Soviet officers of Polish extraction. He commanded all engineering troops of the First Polish Army. Shortly after World War II ended, on 11 July 1945, he was promoted to the rank of Lieutenant General, and became the head of engineering troops of the Polish Armed Forces.

In that capacity he was also the president of Legia Warsaw sports club. On 23 March 1954 he became the Chief of General Staff and deputy Minister of National Defence. In that capacity he was responsible for the bloody quelling of the Poznań 1956 protests. Between 1952 and 1956 he was also briefly a member of the façade Sejm. In March 1968 he was recalled back to the USSR and spent the remainder of his career at various high-ranking posts in the Soviet Army. He died 5 April 1983 in Moscow and was buried at the Kuntsevo Cemetery.

References 

1900 births
1983 deaths
People from Ostrów Mazowiecka
People from Łomża Governorate
Soviet colonel generals
Soviet military personnel of the Russian Civil War
People of the Polish–Soviet War
Soviet military personnel of World War II
Polish military personnel of World War II
Soviet officers in Polish Army 1943-1968
Military Academy of the General Staff of the Armed Forces of the Soviet Union alumni
Grand Crosses of the Order of Polonia Restituta
Recipients of the Order of Lenin
Recipients of the Silver Cross of the Virtuti Militari
Recipients of the Order of the Red Banner
Recipients of the Order of Bogdan Khmelnitsky (Soviet Union), 1st class
Recipients of the Order of Kutuzov, 2nd class
Recipients of the Order of the Cross of Grunwald, 3rd class
Recipients of the Gold Cross of Merit (Poland)
Recipients of the Cross of Valour (Poland)
Recipients of the Order of the Banner of Work
Soviet people of Polish descent
Burials at Kuntsevo Cemetery